Jerry Rapp is a screenwriter, director, and producer.

Career
Rapp is a graduate of the USC School of Cinema/Television, and has been working as a professional screenwriter, director, and producer since 1987.  Rapp’s first screenplay, On The Air, was acquired by Imagine Entertainment, and led to a number of other script sales, including a second picture for Imagine, Tourists, Wishing for Paramount, Foster’s Kids for Universal, Guilty of Suspicion for MGM, and Richie Rich Goes Public for HEG.  He also wrote and produced the feature film, Sand Trap, which aired on HBO.

Rapp’s television credits include, Wishbone for PBS, Itsy Bitsy Spider for USA Network, The Mask for New Line TV, Tales From the Crypt and Monsters.  Rapp wrote and directed the indie feature, The Thing at Pete and Julie’s, the documentary Sound Magic, and, either alone or collaborating has written, directed and produced a number of films which have played in various festivals, including the R&H Educational Film Series for Hypnotic, with Daedalus Howell, which aired on Showtime, as well as British comedy channels.

Rapp recently wrote the film Moving Alan, which has played in several festivals and garnered a number of awards.

Rapp's current feature, Mojave Phone Booth, which he wrote and produced, is currently playing in domestic and international festivals, and being developed as a one-hour drama series.

In addition, Rapp works as a full-time script doctor and ghost writer, and has worked on and/or revised well over a hundred screenplays for studios and individuals.

Rapp's latest release is a short film entitled Salut - a visual poem set against the madness of war.

Rapp recently wrote and produced the feature film "Looking Glass" starring Nicolas Cage.

References

Living people
American male screenwriters
American television producers
Year of birth missing (living people)